Susanne "Susi" Neumann (29 May 1959 – 13 January 2019) was a German author, chairwoman of a labour union, and cleaner. She gained public recognition after an appearance on the German talk-show Anne Will. She is known for her direct talk, criticism of the social state and critique of working poor. She is furthermore known for her talk with Sigmar Gabriel about the crumbling middle class. She wrote a book about her concerns and experiences, which was published in 2016.

Life 

Neumann was born in Gelsenkirchen and came from a civil servant family.  She worked as a house cleaning expert in Gelsenkirchen from 1981.

She was a trade unionist and the district chairman in the IG Bauen-Agrar-Umwelt for the area Emscher-Lippe-Aa.

Publications 
In her book Frau Neumann haut auf den Putz – Warum wir ein Leben lang arbeiten und trotzdem verarmen (Ms. Neumann hits the nail on the head - why we work for a lifetime and still become impoverished) published in 2017, she and co-author Andreas Hock outline social conditions in Germany, how its welfare state has degenerated and why people have multiple jobs but still do not earn enough money. Neumann also writes about her own experiences.

References

1959 births
2019 deaths
People from Gelsenkirchen
Social Democratic Party of Germany politicians
German trade unionists
Aufstehen
German women writers
German non-fiction writers